is a railway station in the city of Chiryū, Aichi, Japan, operated by Meitetsu.

Lines
Ushida Station is served by the Meitetsu Nagoya Main Line and is 40.9 kilometers from the terminus of the line at Toyohashi Station.

Station layout
The station has two opposed side platforms connected by a level crossing. The station is unattended.

Platforms

Adjacent stations

Station history
Ushida Station was opened on 1 June 1923, as a station on the Aichi Electric Railway. On 1 April 1935, the Aichi Electric Railway merged with the Nagoya Railroad (the forerunner of present-day Meitetsu). A new station building was completed in September 1992. The station has been unattended since 2004.

Passenger statistics
In fiscal 2017, the station was used by an average of 4,056 passengers daily (boarding passengers only).

Surrounding area
 Chiryū Higashi High School

See also
 List of Railway Stations in Japan

References

External links

 Official web page 

Railway stations in Japan opened in 1923
Railway stations in Aichi Prefecture
Stations of Nagoya Railroad
Chiryū, Aichi